Bayfield High School is a public high school located in Bayfield, Colorado.

Athletics

Teams
Bayfield's athletic teams are nicknamed the Wolverines and the school's colors are purple, black, and gold. Bayfield teams compete in the following sports:

The Marching Wolverines 
Baseball
Boys basketball
Boys soccer
Football
Girls basketball
Girls soccer
Track & field
Volleyball
Wrestling

State championships

Cross Country
2005 Colorado Class 3A Boys State Champions
Boys basketball
2018 Colorado Class 3A State Champions
Football
1996 Colorado Class 2A State Champions
2015 Colorado Class 2A State Champions
2017 Colorado Class 2A State Champions
Track & field
1991 Colorado Class 2A Girls State Champions
2018 Colorado Class 3A Boys State Champions

Demographics
81% of the student population at Bayfield High School identify as Caucasian, 15% identify as Hispanic, 2% identify as American Indian/Alaskin Native, 2% identify as multiracial, 1% identify as Asian, and 0.3% identify as Hawaiian Native/Pacific Islander. The student body makeup is 57% male and 43% female.

References

External links
 Official site

Public high schools in Colorado